Mumbai Saga is a 2021 Indian Hindi-language action crime film directed by Sanjay Gupta and produced by T-Series. It features an ensemble cast of John Abraham, Emraan Hashmi, Kajal Aggarwal, Mahesh Manjrekar,  Rohit Roy, Anjana Sukhani, Prateik Babbar, Samir Soni, Amole Gupte and Gulshan Grover. Set in the '80s and '90s, Mumbai Saga shows changing phases of Bombay by closing mills to make malls and high-rise buildings.

The film was released theatrically on 19 March 2021. It underperformed commercially as collections were affected by the resurgence in COVID-19 pandemic cases which had led to a night curfew and lockdown imposition in Maharashtra. Later, it was digitally premiered on Amazon Prime Video on April 27, 2021.

Plot 
Amartya Rao Naik belongs to a lower middle class family & his father sells vegetables at a railway overbridge. All the vendors there are forced to pay protection money to gangster Gaitonde. One day, some of the dreaded Gaitonde's henchmen assault Amartya's teenage brother Arjun. Enraged, Amartya trashes the entire gang. He is arrested by the police and subjected to further abuse by Gaitonde's henchmen. He is able to fight them all and earns the respect of criminal Nari Khan, who warns Gaitonde of any further action.

Amartya soon receives bail, courtesy 'Bhau', the party leader of the local 'Chatrapati Sena' which is known for its violent ways and scouts for muscle men like Amartya. Bhau tells him that, now that he has made Gaitonde his arch nemesis, he has to find a solution to it in a week, and if he does, Bhau can lend his political & legal protection in return. Amartya meets Nari's key aide and gets information on Gaitonde's operations. He then attacks his men and is able to confiscate all his arsenal. Later, he secures a bail for Nari and also threatens Gaitonde to get out of his way. Gaitonde realizes his diminishing strength and resents to his fate. With Bhau's blessings, Amartya gets uninhibited control of the city.

Amartya sends Arjun to a boarding school to keep him away from his path of violence. Years later, he is married to his childhood friend Seema, who arranges now grownup Arjun Rao Naik marriage to his sweetheart Nilam and sends the newlywed couple to London again, intending to keep him away from Amartya's criminal life. Meanwhile, Gaitonde has now struck a deal with Sunil Khaitan, a mill owner, as he plans to oust the mill workers in order to utilize the mill land for a large reality project to take advantage of the newly liberalized economy. Amartya, who is wary of Gaitonde's rapid attempts to rise again, kills Khaitan after he refuses to heed his warnings. Arjun returns to India and is attacked by Gaitonde's men as retribution to Khaitan's murder; on the other hand, Khaitan's wife Sonali announces a bounty of 10 crores to any policeman who kills Amartya.

Inspector Vijay Savarkar leads an investigation into Amartya's case and gets hold of Sadashiv, a weakling of Amartya's gang. Sadashiv rats on his colleagues and Vijay is able to kill 4 of them. Arjun correctly suspects Sadashiv as the rat; to verify this, Amartya asks Sadashiv to meet him at a park. He reaches there disguised as a taxi driver and spots policemen prepared for an ambush. Coincidentally, Vijay hires his taxi for his office and they greet each other as Vijay leaves his taxi. Later, Arjun kills Sadashiv, who was under police protection, bribes the constables, and shoots one of them in the arm to project it as an ambush. Bhau advises Amartya to leave the country since Khaitan's death, coupled with the "ambush" on the police, has put a lot of pressure on the police force to find him and it is not safe for him to stay in the city anymore. Amartya leaves for London and Arjun now runs the gang. Vijay gives a court order to Arjun and warns him against absentia, stating that he would get a 'Shoot at sight' order from the court by default and would be free to kill him even in public place. Arjun is shot by Gaitonde's man when he appears in the court; although he survives the attack, he becomes permanently paralyzed below the waist. Amartya returns to India and rescues Arjun from the police, but is shot down by Vijay at the end.

Cast

Special appearances
 Yo Yo Honey Singh in the song "Shor Machega"
 Hommie Dilliwala in the song "Shor Machega"
 Shruti Sinha in the song "Shor Machega"

Production 
Principal photography commenced on 27 August 2019 in Mumbai and also took place in Hyderabad. The film wrapped up in October 2020.

Soundtrack 

The film's music was composed by Yo Yo Honey Singh, Payal Dev and Tanishk Bagchi while lyrics written by Hommie Dilliwala, Yo Yo Honey Singh, Prashant Ingole and Manoj Muntashir.

Reception

Box office 
Mumbai Saga earned 2.82 crore at the domestic box office on its opening day. On the second day, the film had a slight dip as it collected 2.40 crore. It recovered on the third day by collecting 3.52 crore, taking the total domestic opening weekend collection to 8.74 crore.

, with a gross of 19.68 crore in India and 2.61 crore overseas, the film has a worldwide gross collection of 22.29 crore.

Critical response
Upon release, Mumbai Saga received "mixed to positive" reviews from the film critics.
On the review aggregator website Rotten Tomatoes, the film holds an approval rating of 33% based on 9 reviews, with an average rating of 4.80/10.
Taran Adarsh of Bollywood Hungama gave the film 3.5 out of 5 stars calling Mumbai Saga "Power-Packed" and wrote, "Action-packed entertainer with powerful dialogue and terrific performance by John Abraham and Emraan Hashmi".

References

External links 
 
 

2020s Hindi-language films
Indian crime action films
Indian gangster films
Indian historical action films
Films scored by Yo Yo Honey Singh
Films scored by Tanishk Bagchi
Films scored by Payal Dev
Films set in the 1980s
Films set in the 1990s
Films set in Mumbai
Films directed by Sanjay Gupta
Films postponed due to the COVID-19 pandemic
Film productions suspended due to the COVID-19 pandemic